Frederick Foster Gough (bapt. 7 February 1825; died 1 June 1889) was a Protestant Christian missionary who served with the Church Missionary Society during the late Qing Dynasty in China.

The second son of Ralph and Catharine Gough of Gosbrook House (later Gorsebrook  House), Bushbury, Staffordshire, he was christened on 7 February 1825 at the church of Saint Peter, Wolverhampton, Staffordshire. He was educated at St John's College, Cambridge, where he obtained a BA in 1847 and his MA in 1853.

In 1848 he became a curate of St. Luke's, Birmingham. He married Mary Vigars LeMare, at Christ Church, Salford, Lancashire, on 4 April 1854; he was widowed seven years later when his wife died in London in early 1861. He then married Ann Marie, the widow of the Reverend John Jones who had been a missionary in Ningbo (Ningpo). They were married at Trinity Church, Bow, London on 15 November 1866. In 1882 he married yet again in Islington, London; the bride was Emily Bear.

He died on 1 June 1889 in Wolverhampton, Staffordshire..

References

Notes

Alumni of St John's College, Cambridge
Anglican missionaries in China
Anglican writers
1889 deaths
1820s births
English Anglican missionaries
British expatriates in China